Canzoni contro la natura ("Songs against nature") is the eighth studio album by Italian band Zen Circus, released on 21 January 2014 by label La Tempesta Dischi.

Track listing
"Viva"
"Postumia"
"Canzone contro la natura"
"Vai vai vai!"
"Albero di tiglio"
"L'anarchico e il generale"
"Mi son ritrovato vivo"
"Dalì"
"No Way"
"Sestri Levante"

Charts

References

External links
 Canzoni contro la natura at Discogs
 Canzoni contro la natura at AllMusic

2014 albums
Zen Circus albums